Unreal Estate is the second live album by Swedish death metal band Entombed. Originally it was planned to be released on 20 October 2004, but printing problems pushed its release to February 2005.

Track listing

References

Entombed (band) albums
2004 live albums